The drop is an approximated unit of measure of volume, the amount dispensed as one drop from a dropper or drip chamber. It is often used in giving quantities of liquid drugs to patients, and occasionally in cooking and in organic synthesis. The abbreviations gt or gtt come from the Latin noun gutta ("drop").

The volume of a drop is not well defined: it depends on the device and technique used to produce the drop, on the strength of the gravitational field, and on the viscosity, density, and the surface tension of the liquid.

Several exact definitions exist:
 In medicine, IV drips deliver 10, 15, 20, or 60 drops per ml. Micro-drip sets deliver 60 drops per ml and 10, 15, or 20 drops per ml for a macro-drip set.
 Prior to the adoption of the minim in the early 19th century, the smallest unit of fluid measure in the Apothecaries' systems of the United States customary units and pre-1824 English units was, while inexact, presumed to be equal to 1/60 of a fluid dram or 1/480 of a fluid ounce.

In organic synthesis, a synthetic procedure will often call for the addition of a reagent "dropwise" with the aid of a syringe or a dropping funnel. The rate of addition for such a procedure is taken to be slow but is otherwise vague: one chemist might consider dropwise to be one drop per second, another five to ten drops per second (almost a stream). Furthermore, needle gauge or the dimensions of the glassware also affect drop volume. To improve reproducibility, experimental procedures also note the total amount of time required to add the liquid or another measure of addition rate.  In a related usage, the amount of a reagent, whose precise quantity is unimportant, will sometimes be given in terms of the number of drops, often from a glass pipette.  In this usage, a drop is typically considered to be approximately 0.05 ml.  The practice of giving quantities this way has declined in usage.

History

In the first decade of the 19th century, the minim, the smallest unit of Apothecary Measure, was promoted by the pharmaceutical and medical establishments as an alternative to the drop. It was noted that the size of a drop can vary considerably depending on the viscosity and specific gravity of the fluid, as well as the size and shape of the vessel from which it is poured. (At the time, surface tension was not well understood.) The minim came with a set of procedures for ensuring accurate measurement, specifically, diluting powerful medicines that had previously been measured by the drop, then using a "minimometer" or "minim glass" (graduated pipette) with minim marks at regular intervals. The minim was defined as one 60th of a fluid dram or one 480th of a fluid ounce. This is equal to about 61.6 μL (U.S.) or 59.2 μL (Britain).

Pharmacists have since moved to metric measurements, with a drop being rounded to exactly 0.05 mL (50 μL, that is, 20 drops per milliliter). In hospitals, intravenous tubing is used to deliver medication in drops of various sizes ranging from 10 drops/mL to 60 drops/mL. A drop is abbreviated gtt, with gtts used for the plural, often seen on prescriptions. Other sources abbreviate gt for singular, and gtt for plural. These abbreviations come from gutta (plural guttae), the Latin word for drop.

See also
 Drop (liquid)

References

Units of volume
Cooking weights and measures
Metricated units